St. Luke School is a K–8 private, coeducational, college-preparatory day school located in Columbus, Georgia, United States.  The school was established in 1998 by members of St. Luke Church.  St. Luke School is accredited by AdvancED/Southern Association of Colleges and Schools (SACS).

References

External links

Schools in Georgia (U.S. state)
Columbus, Georgia
Educational institutions established in 1998
1998 establishments in Georgia (U.S. state)